An Electron interferometer is an interferometer based on exploiting the wave character of electrons.

Overview
Interferometry inherently depends on the wave nature of the object. As pointed out by de Broglie in his PhD thesis, particles, including electrons can behave
like waves (the so-called wave–particle duality, now explained in the general framework of quantum mechanics). One of the first interferometry experiments with
electrons was the double-slit experiment. Since electrons are charged, they repel each other, thus rendering the theoretical analysis more difficult than for
uncharged sources like, e.g., neutrons or atoms. To obtain high precision the de Broglie wavelength needs to be small, which again favours neutrons or (heavy)
atoms since they have a higher mass. Therefore, many high precision experiments now deploy atom interferometers based on the Sagnac effect.

See also
Atom interferometer

Interferometers